Dalton is an unincorporated community in Dalton Township, Wayne County, in the U.S. state of Indiana.

History
Dalton was platted in 1828. An old variant name of the community was called Palmyra.

A post office was established at Dalton in 1838, and remained in operation until it was discontinued in 1901.

Geography

References

Unincorporated communities in Wayne County, Indiana
Unincorporated communities in Indiana